Una O'Connor may refer to:

 Una O'Connor (actress) (1880–1959), Irish actress
 Úna O'Connor (camogie) (born 1938), former Irish camogie player